The Cima della Bianca is a mountain of the Lepontine Alps and  located on the border between the cantons of Ticino and Graubünden. It is in Switzerland and lies east of the Scopi.

References

External links
 Cima della Bianca on Hikr

Mountains of the Alps
Mountains of Switzerland
Mountains of Ticino
Graubünden–Ticino border
Lepontine Alps